The year 2018 is the 6th year in the history of the Absolute Championship Berkut, a mixed martial arts, kickboxing and Brazilian jiu-jitsu promotion based in Russia.

List of events

ACB MMA

ACB KB

ACB JJ

ACB 78: Young Eagles 24

Absolute Championship Berkut 78: Young Eagles 24 was a mixed martial arts event held by Absolute Championship Berkut on January 13, 2018 at the Sports Hall Coliseum in Grozny, Russia.

Background

Bonus awards:
 
The following fighters will be awarded $5,000 bonuses:
Fight of the Night: Alibek Akhazaev vs. Oberdan Vieira
Knockout of the Night: Yusup Umarov
Submission of the Night: Abdul-Rakhman Makhajiev
$3000 Stoppage Victory Bonuses: Andreas Stahl, Alan Gomes, Adlan Mamaev, Adam Aliev, Magomed Sulumov, Amir Elzhurkaev, Sayfullah Dzhabrailov, Magomed Raisov

Results

ACB JJ 10: Panza vs. Rocha

Absolute Championship Berkut Jiu-Jitsu 10: Panza vs. Rocha was a Brazilian jiu-jitsu event held by Absolute Championship Berkut on January 26, 2018 at the Club Hebraica in São Paulo, Brazil.

Background

Bonus awards:
 
The following fighters will be awarded $5,000 bonuses:
Fight of the Night: Claudio Calasans vs. Patrick Gaudio
Fastest submission of the Night: Mikey Musumeci
Best Submission of the Night: Osvaldo Moizinho

Results

ACB 79: Agujev vs. Alfaya

Absolute Championship Berkut 79: Agujev vs. Alfaya was a mixed martial arts event held by Absolute Championship Berkut on January 27, 2018 at the Sports Hall Coliseum in Grozny, Russia.

Background
The card was originally headlined by a title fight between champion Askar Askarov and Rasul Albaskhanov for the ACB Flyweight Championship. On January 13, it was announced Askarov had to withdraw due to heavy angina.  The title fight between Askarov and Albaskhanov has been temporarily postponed.

Batraz Agnaev had to withdraw due to an injury and is not able to defend his Light-Heavyweight title against Döwletjan Ýagşymyradow from Turkmenistan and the bout was canceled. Luis Fernando Miranda will step in as a replacement against Ýagşymyradow.

Magomed Magomedov was to face Walter Pereira Jr. at this event but had to withdraw due to illness. The bout has been temporarily postponed to ACB 81.

Islam Isaev, Said-Khamzat Avkhadov, Thiago Bonifacio Silva and Zach Makovsky were injured during training camp. So they were removed from the card.

Bonus awards:
 
The following fighter will be awarded $10,000 bonuses:
Submission of the Night: Rasul Shovkhalov
$5000 Stoppage Victory Bonuses: Husein Kushagov, Magomed Ginazov, Davletdzhan Yagshimuradov and Arbi Agujev

Results

ACB 80: Tumenov vs. Burrell

Absolute Championship Berkut 80: Tumenov vs. Burrell was a mixed martial arts event held by Absolute Championship Berkut on February 16, 2018 at the Basket-Hall in Krasnodar, Russia.

Background
The card was originally headlined by a title fight between champion Mukhamed Berkhamov and Albert Tumenov for the ACB Welterweight Championship. On January 1, it was announced Berkhamov had to withdraw due to a broken arm. Nah-Shon Burrell will step in as a replacement against Tumenov.

Initially Muhammed Kokov was supposed to face Bubba Jenkins, but Jenkins withdrew from the fight due to injury. The Brazilian Alexandre Bezerra will step in as a replacement against Kokov.

Bonus awards:
 
The following fighters will be awarded $10,000 bonuses:
Fight of the Night:Daniel Santos vs. Dukvaha Astamirov

Result

ACB 81: Saidov vs. Carneiro

Absolute Championship Berkut 81: Saidov vs. Carneiro was a mixed martial arts event held by Absolute Championship Berkut on February 23, 2018 at The Dome - Dubai Sports City in Dubai, United Arab Emirates.

Background
Yoni Sherbatov had to withdraw due to a shoulder injury and is not able to fight against Josiel Silva. Sam Halliday will step in as a replacement against Silva.

Bonus awards:
 
The following fighters will be awarded $10,000 bonuses:
Submission of the Night: Abdul-Rahman Dzhanaev
$5000 Stoppage Victory Bonuses: Khuseyn Shaikhaev, Josiel Silva, Narek Avagyan, Ramazan Kuramagimedov, Islam Isaev, Luke Barnatt

Results

ACB KB 13: From Paris with war

ACB KB 13: From Paris with war was a kickboxing event held by Absolute Championship Berkut on February 24, 2018 at the Halle Georges Carpentier in Paris, France.

Background

Bonus awards:
 
The following fighters will be awarded $10,000 bonuses:
Fight of the Night:
Knockout of the Night:
$5000 Stoppage Victory Bonuses:

Results

ACB JJ 11: Ramos vs. Najmi

Absolute Championship Berkut Jiu-Jitsu 11: Ramos vs. Najmi was a Brazilian jiu-jitsu event held by Absolute Championship Berkut on March 3, 2018 at the Pavelló Olímpic de Badalona in Badalona, Spain.

Background

Bonus awards:
 
The following fighters will be awarded $5,000 bonuses:
Fight of the Night:
Fastest submission of the Night:
Best Submission of the Night:

Results

ACB 82: Silva vs. Kolobegov

Absolute Championship Berkut 82: Silva vs. Kolobegov was a mixed martial arts event held by Absolute Championship Berkut on March 9, 2018 in São Paulo, Brazil.

Background

Bonus awards:
 
The following fighters will be awarded $10,000 bonuses:
Fight of the Night: Matheus Mattos vs. Nashkho Galaev
$5000 Stoppage Victory Bonuses: Gregory Milliard, Walter Pereira Jr., Brett Cooper, Rodolfo Vieira

Results

ACB KB 14: Diamonds

ACB KB 14: Diamonds will be a kickboxing event held by Absolute Championship Berkut on March 23, 2018 at the Grinn Center in Orel, Russia
.

Background

Bonus awards:
 
The following fighters will be awarded $10,000 bonuses:
Fight of the Night:
Knockout of the Night:
$5000 Stoppage Victory Bonuses:

Results

ACB 83: Borisov vs. Kerimov

Absolute Championship Berkut 83: Borisov vs. Kerimov will be a mixed martial arts event held by Absolute Championship Berkut on March 24, 2018 at the Serhedchi Olympic Sport Center in Baku, Azerbaijan.

Background
Efrain Escudero did not reach Baku because of airplane delays in Germany, his fight against Khamzat Aushev was canceled.

Bonus awards:
 
The following fighters will be awarded $10,000 bonuses:
Fight of the Night: Rustam Kerimov vs. Oleg Borisov
Submission of the Night: Dilenio Lopes
$5000 Stoppage Victory Bonuses: Ashab Zulaev, Daniel Omielanczuk, Amir Aliakbari

Results

ACB 84: Agujev vs. Burrell

Absolute Championship Berkut 84: Burrell vs. Agujev was a mixed martial arts event held by Absolute Championship Berkut on April 7, 2018 at the Ondrej Nepela Arena in Bratislava, Slovakia.

Background
The card was originally headlined by a fight between Attila Végh and Jose Daniel Toledo. On March 30, it was announced Vegh had to withdraw because he torn his meniscus. Ron Stallings will step in as a replacement against Toledo.

Ludovit Klein had to withdraw due to injury, Luis Alberto Nogueira will step in to face Islam Sizbulatov.

Bonus awards:
 
The following fighters will be awarded $10,000 bonuses:
Fight of the Night: Joshua Aveles vs. Adrian Zieliński
Knockout of the Night: Yusup Umarov
Submission of the Night: Rany Saadeh
$5000 Stoppage Victory Bonuses: Jae Young Kim, Jose Daniel Toledo, Maciej Rozanski

Results

ACB JJ 12: Wardzinski vs Pena

Absolute Championship Berkut Jiu-Jitsu 12: Wardzinski vs Pena will be a Brazilian jiu-jitsu event held by Absolute Championship Berkut on April 14, 2018 at the Almaty Arena in Almaty, Kazakhstan.

Background

Bonus awards:
 
The following fighters will be awarded $5,000 bonuses:
Fight of the Night:
Fastest submission of the Night:
Best Submission of the Night:

Results

ACB KB 15: Grand Prix Kitek

ACB KB 15: Grand Prix Kitek will be a kickboxing event held by Absolute Championship Berkut on April 20, 2018 at the
Dynamo Sports Palace in Moscow, Russia
.

Background

Bonus awards:
 
The following fighters will be awarded $10,000 bonuses:
Fight of the Night:
Knockout of the Night:
$5000 Stoppage Victory Bonuses:

Results

ACB 85: Leone vs Ginazov

Absolute Championship Berkut 85: Leone vs Ginazov will be a mixed martial arts event held by Absolute Championship Berkut on April 21, 2018 at the RDS Stadium in Rimini, Italy.

Background
Bonus awards:
 
The following fighters will be awarded $10,000 bonuses:
Fight of the Night: Amirkhan Adaev vs. Aurel Pirtea
Submission of the Night: Miguel Felipe Bunes da Silva
$5000 Stoppage Victory Bonuses: Niola Dipchikov, Geane Herrera, Wendres da Silva

Results

ACB JJ 13: Rocha vs. Almeida

Absolute Championship Berkut Jiu-Jitsu 13: Rocha vs. Almeida was a Brazilian jiu-jitsu event held by Absolute Championship Berkut on May 5, 2018 at the Walter Pyramid in Long Beach, USA.

Background

Bonus awards:
 
The following fighters will be awarded $5,000 bonuses:
Fight of the Night:
Fastest submission of the Night:
Best Submission of the Night:

Results

ACB 86: Balaev vs. Raisov 2

Absolute Championship Berkut 86: Balaev vs. Raisov 2 will be a mixed martial arts event held by Absolute Championship Berkut on May 5, 2018 at the Olimpiyskiy in Moscow, Russia .

Background
The title fight between Abdul-Aziz Abdulvakhabov and Ustarmagomed Gadzhidaudov got cancelled due to Gadzhidaudov injury.

Mukhamed Berkhamov had to withdraw due to an injury and is not able to defend his Welterweight title against Beslan Isaev and the bout was canceled. Ciro Rodrigues step up on to face Isaev.

Eduard Vartanyan had to pull out of his fight against Ali Bagov due to a tore ligaments in his knee. Gleristone Santos step up on short notice to face Bagov.

The fight between Abdul-Rakhman Temirov and Rasuk Mirzaev got cancelled due to Mirzaev injury. Denis Silva step up on short notice to face Temirov.

The fight between Akop Stepanyan and Arman Ospanov got cancelled due to Stepanyan illnesses.

Bonus awards:
 
The following fighters will be awarded $10,000 bonuses:
Fight of the Night:  Koshkin vs Shovkhalov
Knockout of the Night: Abdul-Rakhman Temirov 
Submission of the Night: Yusuf Raisov
$5000 Stoppage Victory Bonuses:

Results

ACB 87: Mousah vs. Whiteford

Absolute Championship Berkut 87: Mousah vs. Whiteford will be a mixed martial arts event held by Absolute Championship Berkut on May 19, 2018 at the Motorpoint Arena in Nottingham, England.

Background
Azi Thomas, has been removed from ACB 87 after the organisation were alerted to a prior anti-doping rule violation, Thomas was set to fight Regis Sugden. Stephen Martin will step in to face Sugden.

Bonus awards:
 
The following fighters will be awarded $10,000 bonuses:
Fight of the Night: Dean Garnett vs. Dominique Wooding
Submission of the Night: Alex Gilpin
$5000 Stoppage Victory Bonuses: Andre Winner

Results

ACB 88: Barnatt vs. Celiński

Absolute Championship Berkut 88: Barnatt vs. Celiński will be a mixed martial arts event held by Absolute Championship Berkut on June 16, 2018 at the Sleeman Sports Complex in Brisbane, Australia.

Background 
Due to some complications in obtaining the necessary documents to travel and compete in Australia, Thiago Silva could not make the trip. His fight against Chris Camozzi was canceled.

Brett Cooper had to withdraw of his fight against Adam Townsend due to an injury. Kieran Joblin step up on short notice to face Townsend.

Luis Palomino had to pull out of his fight against Andrew Fisher due to visa issue. Rodolfo Marquez step up on short notice to face Fisher. Fisher has also been forced to withdraw from the card on medical grounds.

Raymison Bruno is out, Andy Young steps in on six days notice to take on Narek Avagyan.

Bonus awards:
 
The following fighters will be awarded $10,000 bonuses:
Fight of the Night: Luke Barnatt vs. Karol Celinski
Submission of the Night: Mindaugas Verzbickas
$5000 Stoppage Victory Bonuses: Marcin Held, Rodolfo Vieira, Kyle Reyes, Narek Avagyan

Results

ACB JJ 14: Ramos vs. Lepri

Absolute Championship Berkut Jiu-Jitsu 14: Ramos vs. Lepri will be a Brazilian jiu-jitsu event held by Absolute Championship Berkut on June 30, 2018 at the Dynamo Sports Palace in Moscow, Russia.

Background

Bonus awards:
 
The following fighters will be awarded $5,000 bonuses:
Fight of the Night:
Fastest submission of the Night:
Best Submission of the Night:

Fight Card

ACB KB 16: Clash of Titans
 

ACB KB 16: Clash of Titans was a kickboxing event produced by the Absolute Championship Berkut that took place on July 13, 2018, at the Unirii Plaza in Târgoviște, Romania.

Fight card

ACB 89: Sarnavskiy vs. Batista [Cancelled]

Absolute Championship Berkut 89: Sarnavskiy vs. Batista was cancelled.

ACB 90: Khamanaev vs. Silva [Cancelled]

Absolute Championship Berkut 90: Khamanaev vs. Silva was cancelled

ACB 91: Duraev vs. Strus [Cancelled]

Absolute Championship Berkut 91: Duraev vs. Strus was cancelled.

ACB 92: Duraev vs. Strus [Cancelled]

Absolute Championship Berkut 92: Duraev vs. Strus was Cancelled.

ACB 89: Abdulvakhabov vs. Bagov 3

Absolute Championship Berkut 89: Abdulvakhabov vs. Bagov 3 will be a mixed martial arts event held by Absolute Championship Berkut on September 8, 2018 at the Basket-Hall in Krasnodar, Russia.

Background 
Due to the cancellation of multiple events, numbering of the future events has been changed. Therefore, the event won't be ACB 93, but ACB 89.

Mukhamed Berkhamov out with an injury, vacates title. Brett Cooper steps up and will fight Albert Tumenov for the vacant ACB Welterweight Championship.

Brett Cooper is out with an injury. Ciro Rodrigues steps up and will fight Albert Tumenov for the vacant Welterweight Championship

Bonus awards:
 
The following fighters will be awarded $10,000 bonuses:
Fight of the Night:
Knockout of the Night:
Submission of the Night:
$5000 Stoppage Victory Bonuses:

Fight card

ACB 90: Vakhaev vs. Bilostenniy 

Absolute Championship Berkut 90: Vakhaev vs. Bilostenniy will be a mixed martial arts event held by Absolute Championship Berkut on November 10, 2018 at the VTB Ice Palace in Moscow, Russia.

Background

Bonus awards:
 
The following fighters will be awarded $10,000 bonuses:
Fight of the Night:
Knockout of the Night:
Submission of the Night:
$5000 Stoppage Victory Bonuses:

Results

References

External links
ACB

Absolute Championship Akhmat
Absolute Championship Berkut events
2018 in mixed martial arts
2018 sport-related lists